Imran Khan (born 1 March 1995), is an Indian professional footballer who plays as a midfielder for Indian Super League club NorthEast United. He operates primarily as a defensive midfielder, but can also be deployed as a left winger and an attacking midfielder.

Club career
Born in Manipur, Khan began his career with Mohammedan in the I-League. He made his professional debut for the club on 15 December 2013 in a league match against Churchill Brothers. He came on as a 90th-minute substitute for Ashim Biswas as Mohammedan lost 3–1.

In 2017, Khan joined I-League 2nd Division side Fateh Hyderabad. After impressing for Hyderabad during the 2017–18 season, Khan joined Indian Super League club Goa. However, due to the Khan struggling to find time with Goa's first-team, he joined I-League club Gokulam Kerala on loan in January 2019. He made his debut for the club on 4 January 2019 in Gokulam's match against Chennai City. He came on as a 67th-minute substitute for Rajesh S as Gokulam Kerala lost 3–2.

NEROCA
On 7 January 2020, it was announced that Khan had joined I-League club NEROCA. Khan made his debut for the club on 14 January 2020 in a 1–0 victory against Real Kashmir.

NorthEast United
In 2020, Imran was signed by NorthEast United on a two-year deal. He scored his first goal in Indian Super League and for the club against Chennaiyin FC on 18 February 2021. In 2020–21 season he made six appearances for NorthEast United and scored a goal.

He played his first match of the 2021–22 Indian Super League season on 4 December 2021, which ended in a 2–1 win as a substitute for Rochharzela in the 95th minute of the game. In the end of the season he made 17 appearances for the club and provides three assists and became the highest assist provider in the 2021–22 season for NorthEast United.

Personal life
Bosnian footballer Enes Sipović's wife Nejra gave birth of a baby boy on 27 May 2022, and decided to name their newborn after the Highlanders' midfielder Imran, having watched him play on television during the 2021–22 ISL season.

Career statistics

Club

References

External links 
 Indian Super League profile

1995 births
Living people
People from Manipur
Indian footballers
Mohammedan SC (Kolkata) players
Fateh Hyderabad A.F.C. players
FC Goa players
Gokulam Kerala FC players
NEROCA FC players
NorthEast United FC players
Association football midfielders
Footballers from Manipur
Indian Super League players
I-League players
I-League 2nd Division players